San Felipe Plaza is a 46-story tower west of the Uptown Houston district in Houston, Texas, United States. Designed by architect Richard Keating, the building was constructed in 1984 by Linbeck Construction Corporation and contains  of leaseable space. The building is the 16th tallest in the city and is the second-tallest building outside of Downtown Houston. It is 2 miles from the Houston Galleria.

History
The building was completed in 1984.

In 1993, Sanchez-O'Brien Oil & Gas leased an additional  of space in the building. During that year other tenants included BHP Petroleum (the U.S. subsidiary of BHP), Maxxam, and Texas Commerce Bank-Tanglewood. The building had served as the U.S. headquarters of BHP. Later in 1993, BHP announced that it was moving its U.S. headquarters, including 200 clerical and professional employees, from San Felipe Plaza to the Cigna Tower in Four Oaks Place. The Consulate of Canada in Houston opened in the building in 2003.

In 2014, AkinMears leased the entire 45th floor of the building.

In 2016, Deutser signed a lease in the building.

In 2018, Encino Energy signed a lease in the building for 76,048 square feet.

Tenants
 Avelo Airlines (Suite 1900) (Corporate headquarters) 
 Deutser
 Encino Energy
 AkinMears (Suite 4500)
 Canadian Trade Commissioner Service Office in Houston (Suite 1700)
 Valaris plc (Suite 3300)
 Westmont Hospitality Group (Suite 4600/4650)

See also

 Architecture of Houston
 List of tallest buildings in Houston

References

External links
San Felipe Plaza at Google's 3D Warehouse

Skyscraper office buildings in Houston
Office buildings completed in 1984
Skidmore, Owings & Merrill buildings
Modernist architecture in Texas